Afrotheora brevivalva is a species of moth of the family Hepialidae. It is native to Tanzania.

References

External links
Hepialidae genera

Endemic fauna of Tanzania
Moths described in 1986
Hepialidae
Insects of Tanzania
Moths of Africa